Oskar Forsman (13 August 1878 – 19 December 1957) was a Finnish rower. He competed in the men's coxed four event at the 1912 Summer Olympics.

References

1878 births
1957 deaths
Finnish male rowers
Olympic rowers of Finland
Rowers at the 1912 Summer Olympics
Sportspeople from Espoo